The 1890 Home Nations Championship was the eighth series of the rugby union Home Nations Championship. Six matches were played between 1 February and 15 March. It was contested by England, Ireland, Scotland and Wales.

Table

Results

Scoring system
The matches for this season were decided on goals scored. A goal was awarded for a successful conversion after a try, for a dropped goal or for a goal from mark. If a game was drawn, any unconverted tries were tallied to give a winner. If there was still no clear winner, the match was declared a draw.

The matches

Wales v Scotland

Wales: Billy Bancroft (Swansea), Charlie Thomas (Newport), Arthur Gould (Newport), Dickie Garrett (Penarth), Percy Lloyd (Llanelli), Evan James (Swansea), William Stadden (Cardiff), Frank Hill (Cardiff) capt., Alexander Bland (Cardiff), William Williams (Cardiff), William Bowen (Swansea), John Meredith (Swansea), Walter Rice Evans (Swansea), Jim Hannan (Newport), Stephen Thomas (Llanelli)

Scotland: Gregor MacGregor (Cambridge Uni), Bill Maclagan (London Scottish) capt., Henry Stevenson (Edinburgh Acads), GR Wilson (Royal HSFP), CE Orr (West of Scotland), Darsie Anderson (London Scottish), W Auld  (West of Scotland), JD Boswell  (West of Scotland), A Dalaglish (Gala), A Duke (Royal HSFP), Frederick Goodhue (London Scottish), MC McEwan (Edinburgh Acads), I MacIntyre (Edinburgh Wands), Robert MacMillan (West of Scotland), JE Orr (West of Scotland)

England v Wales

England: William Grant Mitchell (Richmond), Piercy Morrison (Cambridge U.), Andrew Stoddart (Blackheath) capt., James Valentine (Swinton), JF Wright (Bradford), Francis Hugh Fox (Marlborough Nomads), Sammy Woods (Cambridge U.), JH Dewhurst (Richmond), Richard Budworth (Blackheath), Frank Evershed (Burton), JL Hickson (Bradford), A Robinson (Blackheath), John Rogers (Moseley), Froude Hancock (Blackheath), FW Lowrie (Batley)

Wales: Billy Bancroft (Swansea), Charlie Thomas (Newport), Arthur Gould (Newport) capt., Dickie Garrett (Penarth), Percy Lloyd (Llanelli), David Gwynn (Swansea), William Stadden (Cardiff), William Williams (Cardiff), David William Evans (Cardiff), William Bowen (Swansea), John Meredith (Swansea), Alexander Bland (Cardiff), Willie Thomas (London Welsh), Jim Hannan (Newport), Stephen Thomas (Llanelli)

Scotland v Ireland

Scotland: Gregor MacGregor (Cambridge Uni), Bill Maclagan (London Scottish), Henry Stevenson (Edinburgh Acads), GR Wilson (Royal HSFP), CE Orr (West of Scotland), Darsie Anderson (London Scottish), JD Boswell  (West of Scotland), A Duke (Royal HSFP), Frederick Goodhue (London Scottish), HT Ker (Glasgow Acads), MC McEwan (Edinburgh Acads) capt., I MacIntyre (Edinburgh Wands), Robert MacMillan (West of Scotland), DS Morton West of Scotland, JE Orr (West of Scotland)

Ireland: HP Gifford (Wanderers), RW Dunlop (Dublin U.), RW Johnston (Dublin U.), T Edwards (Landsdowne), RG Warren (Landsdowne) capt., AC McDonnell (Dublin U.), WJN Davies (Besbrook), EF Doran (Landsdowne), EG Forrest (Wanderers), J Moffat (Belfast Albion), J Waites (Bective Rangers), R Stevenson (Dungannon), J Roche (Wanderers), HA Richey (Dublin U.), JH O'Conner (Bective Rangers)

Ireland v Wales

Ireland: Dolway Walkington (NIFC), RW Dunlop (Dublin U.), RW Johnston (Dublin U.), T Edwards (Landsdowne), RG Warren (Landsdowne) capt., AC McDonnell (Dublin U.), J Moffat (Belfast Academy), HT Galbraith (Belfast Academy), J Waites (Bective Rangers), JH O'Conner (Bective Rangers), R Stevenson (Dungannon), J Roche (Wanderers), WJN Davis (Bessbrook), EF Doran (Landsdowne), LC Nash (Queen's Co. Cork)

Wales: Billy Bancroft (Swansea), Charlie Thomas (Newport), Arthur Gould (Newport) capt., Dickie Garrett (Penarth), George Thomas (Newport), David Gwynn (Swansea), Hugh Ingledew (Cardiff), Frank Hill (Cardiff), David William Evans (Cardiff), William Bowen (Swansea), Alexander Bland (Cardiff), Willie Thomas (London Welsh), Jim Hannan (Newport), Tom Graham (Newport), Rowley Thomas (London Welsh)

Scotland v England

Scotland: Gregor MacGregor (Cambridge Uni), Bill Maclagan (London Scottish) capt., Henry Stevenson (Edinburgh Acads), GR Wilson (Royal HSFP), CE Orr (West of Scotland), Darsie Anderson (London Scottish), JD Boswell (West of Scotland), A Dalglish (Gala), Frederick Goodhue (London Scottish), HT Ker (Glasgow Acads), MC McEwan (Edinburgh Acads), I MacIntyre (Edinburgh Wands), Robert MacMillan (West of Scotland), DS Morton West of Scotland, JE Orr (West of Scotland)

England: William Grant Mitchell (Richmond), Piercy Morrison (Cambridge U.), Randolph Aston (Cambridge U.), JW Dyson (Huddersfield), Mason Scott (Northern), Francis Hugh Fox (Marlborough Nomads), Sammy Woods (Cambridge U.), D Jowett (Heckmondwike), Frank Evershed (Burton), JL Hickson (Bradford) capt., A Robinson (Blackheath), John Rogers (Moseley), H Bedford (Morley), E Holmes (Manningham) J Toothill (Bradford)

England v Ireland

England: William Grant Mitchell (Richmond), Piercy Morrison (Cambridge U.), Randolph Aston (Cambridge U.), Andrew Stoddart (Blackheath) capt., Mason Scott (Northern), FW Spence (Birkenhead Park), Frank Evershed (Burton), JL Hickson (Bradford), Sammy Woods (Cambridge U.), JT Toothill (Bradford), D Jowett (Heckmondwike), John Rogers (Moseley), H Bedford (Morley), E Holmes (Manningham), A Robinson (Blackheath),

Ireland: Dolway Walkington (NIFC), RW Dunlop (Dublin U.), RW Johnston (Dublin U.), T Edwards (Landsdowne), Benjamin Tuke (Bective Rangers), RG Warren (Landsdowne) capt., JN Lytle (NIFC), EG Forrest (Wanderers), J Waites (Bective Rangers), JH O'Conner (Bective Rangers), R Stevenson (Dungannon), J Roche (Wanderers), WJN Davis (Bessbrook), Victor Le Fanu (Landsdowne), LC Nash (Queen's Co. Cork)

Bibliography

External links

1889-90
1889–90 in British rugby union
1889–90 in English rugby union
rugby union
rugby union
Home Nations Championship
1889–90 in Scottish rugby union